= List of executive orders by Sergio Osmeña =

Listed below are executive orders signed by Philippine President Sergio Osmeña.

== 1944 ==
No.	Title	Date signed
15-W	Reorganizing and consolidating the executive departments of the Commonwealth Government	August 8, 1944
16-W	Creating a committee to study and recommend a plan of reorganization of the Commonwealth Government for the purpose of effecting economy, efficiency and simplification in its operations	August 14, 1944
17-W	Amending Executive Order No. 16-W creating a Committee on Relief for Filipinos stranded in the United States on account of the war	August 30, 1944
18-W	Providing funds for the operation of the Government of the Commonwealth of the Philippines during the fiscal year ending June thirtieth, nineteen hundred and forty-five	August 31, 1944
19-W	Appropriating funds to be used as aid for the operation of the provincial, city and municipal governments which may be reestablished in the Philippines upon reoccupation	September 21, 1944
20-W	Prescribing instructions for the conduct of public affairs of the Commonwealth Government in the United States during the absence of the President	September 27, 1944
21	Declaring to be on active service in the Philippine Army all persons now actively serving in recognized military forces in the Philippines	October 28, 1944
22	Fixing the salaries of the officers and enlisted men of the Philippine Army	October 28, 1944
23	Creating a Board of Inquiry to investigate charges of disloyalty to the Commonwealth of the Philippines and the United States of America in the Province of Leyte, and consider the legal problems and matters of public policy involved therein	November 2, 1944
24	Amending Executive Order No. 371 of October 2, 1941, fixing the maximum selling prices of certain articles of prime necessity, and promulgating rules and regulations for the enforcement thereof	November 6, 1944
25	Promulgating rules and regulations concerning currency, books and accounts of banks and their branches and agencies in the provinces, provincial, city and municipal treasuries and other Government accountable officers and debt moratorium	November 18, 1944
26	Amending Executive Order Numbered Twenty-Four entitled "Amending Executive Order No. 371 of October 2, 1941, fixing the maximum selling prices of certain articles of prime necessity and promulgating rules and regulations for the enforcement thereof"	November 21, 1944

== 1945 ==
No.	Title	Date signed
27	Reorganizing the executive departments of the Commonwealth Government	February 27, 1945
28	Further amending Executive Order No. 24, dated November 6, 1944, entitled "Amending Executive Order No. 371 of October 2, 1941, fixing the maximum selling prices of certain articles of prime necessity, and promulgating rules and regulations for the enforcement thereof"	February 28, 1945
29	Amending paragraph one of Executive Order No. 382, Dated December 15, 1941, entitled "Authorizing the commandeering of food, fuel, building materials, and other articles or commodities of prime necessity, prohibiting and penalizing the hoarding thereof, and providing for a more effective enforcement of the provisions of all antiprofiteering orders"	March 7, 1945
30	Appropriating funds for the operation of the Government of the Commonwealth of the Philippines as reestablished, for a portion of the fiscal year ending June Thirtieth, Nineteen Hundred and Forty-Five	March 8, 1945
31	Prescribing the office hours to be observed in the different bureaus and offices of the Government	March 8, 1945
32	Amending Executive Order No. 25 Promulgating rules and regulations concerning currency, books and accounts of banks and their branches and agencies in the provinces, provincial, city and municipal treasuries and other Government accountable offices and debt moratorium	March 10, 1945
33	Creating the Banking Division of the National Treasury, Commonwealth of the Philippines	March 10, 1945
34	Amending traffic regulations for vehicles	March 10, 1945
35	Authorizing the Emergency Control Administrator and the officers and agents specifically authorized by him to administer oath in relation to the enforcement of all anti-profiteering laws and orders	March 10, 1945
36	Reviving the regrouping of provinces for judicial purposes as provided in Act No. 4007 of the Philippine Legislature and repealing Commonwealth Act No. 544 which creates positions of district attorneys	March 10, 1945
37	Abolishing the Court of Appeals	March 10, 1945
38	Amending Section 1659 of the Revised Administrative Code as Amended by Section 1 of Commonwealth Act No. 543	March 10, 1945
39	Appropriating the sum of One Million Pesos for civilian defense	March 10, 1945
40	Amending certain provisions of the Revised Administrative Code on the judiciary, by increasing the number of Justices of the Supreme Court, and for other purposes	May 4, 1945
41	Amending certain provisions of the Administrative Code concerning appointment of and supervision over notaries public in the City of Manila	May 11, 1945
42	Revoking Executive Order No. 385 dated December 17, 1941 and reviving the provisions of Commonwealth Act No. 320	May 26, 1945
43	Appropriating funds for the operating expenses of the Alabang Laboratories for the period from February 27 to June 30, 1945	May 26, 1945
44	Amending Article 114 of the Revised Penal Code defining and punishing the crime of treason	May 31, 1945
45	Suspending the operation of Act No. 4139 in so far as said Act provides for the collection of rentals for textbooks	June 2, 1945
46	Amending Executive Order No. Twenty-Five, entitled "Promulgating rules and regulations concerning currency, books and accounts of banks and their branches and agencies in the provinces, provincial, city and municipal treasuries and other Government accountable offices and debt moratorium"	June 6, 1945
47	Amending Sections 5-a and 5-b of Chapter III of Executive Order No. 178, entitled "Prescribing the procedure, including the modes of proof, in cases before courts-martial, courts of inquiry, military commissions and other military tribunals of the Army of the Philippines"	June 6, 1945
48	Revising Paragraph 1, Title II of Executive Order No. 25, dated November 18, 1944, so as to permit the reopening of banks in the Philippines subject to the approval of the Bank Commissioner	June 6, 1945
49	Promulgating rules and regulations governing certain transactions of banking institutions during the enemy occupation	June 6, 1945
50	Amending Section 2466 of the Revised Administrative Code by creating tow additional branches for the Municipal Court of the City of Manila	June 7, 1945
51	Transferring certain police and law-enforcement powers to the Chief of Staff, Army of the Philippines, and authorizing him to organize a Military Police Command and to prescribe rules for the conduct and administration thereof	June 7, 1945
52	Appropriating the sum of One Million One Hundred Sixty Eight Thousand Pesos for public works	June 7, 1945
53	Creating a National Board of Inquiry to investigate charges of disloyalty to the Governments of the Commonwealth of the Philippines and the United States of America	June 8, 1945
54	Appropriating funds for the salaries of two additional judges of the Municipal Court of Manila for a portion of the fiscal year ending June Thirtieth Nineteen Hundred and Forty-Five	June 8, 1945
55	Suspending the running of the period of eligibility for reinstatement in the Civil Service during the enemy occupation of the Philippines	July 16, 1945
56	Amending Executive Order No. 39, dated March 10, 1945, entitled "Appropriating the sum of One Million Pesos for civilian defense"	July 20, 1945
57	Creating the Petroleum Products Control Administration to take charge of rationing petroleum products and to control the distribution and use of same for Government and essential civilian operated motor vehicles and stationary and marine engines	July 25, 1945
58	Reducing the territory of the City of Greater Manila	July 26, 1945
59	Creating the Metropolitan Transportation Service (METRAN)	July 27, 1945
60	Amending Executive Order Numbered Seventy-Six, dated December Twenty-Two, Nineteen Hundred and Thirty-Six, creating the Board of Food Inspection	July 31, 1945
61	Repealing Executive Order No. 38 and reviving Section 1659 of the Revised Administrative Code, as amended by Commonwealth Act No. 543	August 4, 1945
62	Fixing the official markups for wholesalers and retailers of certain commodities in order to determine the ceiling prices	August 14, 1945
63	Creating a Council of State	August 14, 1945
64	Establishing a National War Crimes Office	August 16, 1945
65	Providing for the provisional release on bail of political prisoners, prior to the institution of the corresponding criminal cases against them, suspending, insofar as they are concerned, the application of Article 125 of the Revised Penal Code, and for other purposes	September 3, 1945
66	Extending the period provided in Executive Order Numbered Two Hundred and Fifty-Eight, dated March Twelve, Nineteen Hundred and Forty, for which payment may be authorized of the salaries and wages of newly appointed or transferred officers and employees of the national, provincial, city, and municipal governments while their appointments are pending action by the proper authorities	September 14, 1945
67	Prescribing instructions to be followed in the conduct of public affairs during the time that the President is outside the Philippines	September 26, 1945
68	Demobilization of elements of the Philippine Army and other guerilla units in the field	September 26, 1945
69	Creating the Resistance Movement Medal and Resistance Movement Diploma in recognition of the services rendered by the guerilla forces and patriotic citizens in resisting the enemy	September 26, 1945
70	Revoking Executive Order No. 20-W	October 31, 1945
71	Prohibiting during the present emergency the production or manufacture of alcohol or fermented or spirituous liquors or any other alcoholic beverage from sugar, sugar cane products, rice, corn, sweet potatoes and cassava	November 6, 1945
72	Prescribing the office hours to be observed in all offices of the Government	November 8, 1945
73	Appropriating the sum of Six Million Seven Hundred Fifty Thousand Pesos for Public Works	November 12, 1945
74	Effectuating the organization of the Philippine Relief and Rehabilitation Administration and the abolition of the Emergency Control Administration	November 28, 1945
75	Amending Executive Order No. 59, dated July 27, 1945, entitled "Creating the Metropolitan Transportation Service (METRAN)"	December 1, 1945
76	Prescribing rules on the organization and functions of the Office of Foreign Relations	December 3, 1945
77	Amending Executive Order No. 332, dated March 14, 1941 so as to include among the exemptions therein provided, the quarters allowance of local government officials and employees	December 5, 1945
78	Authorizing provincial, city and municipal officials and employees to collect actual and necessary expenses incurred for subsistence and lodging when traveling on official business in lieu of per diems upon approval of the department head concerned and imposing certain limitations on travels on official business	December 5, 1945
79	Creating a Quezon Memorial Committee to take charge of the nationwide campaign to raise funds for the erection of a national monument in honor of the late President Manuel L. Quezon	December 17, 1945
80	Designating the Chief of Staff and the Deputy Chief of Staff of the Army of the Philippines	December 18, 1945
81	Creating the "Purchasing Agency Revolving Fund" and setting aside the sum of Two Hundred Thousand Pesos for its operation	December 18, 1945
82	Authorizing the Philippine Press Wireless, Inc., Manila, to handle by radio types of service besides that authorized by the company's franchise, Commonwealth Act Numbered Three Hundred and Eighty-Six, to and from Manila to and from points exterior to the Philippines, until January Twenty-Fourth, Nineteen Hundred and Forty-Six	December 24, 1945
83	Appropriating funds for the payment of gratuities to officials and employees of the national, provincial, city, and municipal governments and of the corporations or companies owned or controlled by the Government	December 24, 1945

== 1946 ==
No.	Title	Date signed
84	Prescribing the procedure for coursing correspondence to and from the United States and foreign countries	January 2, 1946
85	Creating the Government Procurement Commission	January 7, 1946
86	Amending further Section 133 of the Revised Administrative Code, as amended by Executive Order No. 40, dated May 4, 1945	January 7, 1946
87	Amending Executive Order No. 82 dated December 24, 1945, which authorizes the Philippine Press Wireless, Inc., Manila, to handle by radio types of service besides that authorized by the company's franchise	January 25, 1946
88	Authorizing the Director of Forestry to issue to tobacco growers gratuitous license to cut forest products exclusively for the construction or repair of tobacco warehouses and curing sheds for one year	January 31, 1946
89	Amending Sections 153, 154, 156, 157 and 161 of the Revised Administrative Code, as amended by Act No. 4007 of the Philippine Legislature and as revived by Executive Order No. 36, dated March 10, 1945, so as to restore the number of Judges of First Instance before the Japanese occupation, appropriating the necessary funds therefor, and for other purposes	January 31, 1946
90	Amending Sections 28 and 30 of Act No. 1459, known as the Corporation Law, as amended, in so far as they apply to corporations, other than banks, in which the United States has or may have a vested interest, pursuant to the powers granted or delegated by the Trading with the Enemy Act, as amended, and similar Acts of Congress relating to the same subject, or by Executive Order No. 9095 of the President of the United States, as heretofore or hereafter amended, or both	February 4, 1946
91	Fixing new ceiling prices of all commodities and for other purposes	February 5, 1946
92	Appropriating funds for the rehabilitation of the National Coconut Corporation, the Agricultural and Industrial Bank, and the Manila Hotel Company	February 12, 1946
93	Appropriating the sum of Thirteen Million Pesos for public works	February 14, 1946
94	Revoking Administrative Order No. 4 relating to redemption, under certain conditions, of emergency currency notes possessed by members of the American forces repatriated for health and other reasons, and providing funds therefor	February 19, 1946
95	Revoking Executive Order No. 332, dated March 14, 1941, entitled "Prohibiting the payment of additional compensation to officers and employees of the National Government including those on the boards of management of Government-owned and controlled enterprises"	February 20, 1946
96	Appropriating funds for the operating expenses of the Board of Pensions for Veterans for the current fiscal year	February 26, 1946
97	Organizing certain barrios and sitios of the municipality of Santiago, province of Isabela, into an independent municipality under the name of San Mateo	March 7, 1946
98	Creating a National Urban Planning Commission and defining its powers and duties	March 11, 1946
99	Amending Executive Order No. 320, dated January 27, 1941, entitled "Regulating the maintenance and operation of race track and horse racing"	March 11, 1946
100	Transferring the functions of preserving peace and maintaining law and order to the Provost Marshal General of the Philippine Army and placing the Military Police Command of the Philippine Army under the general supervision and control of the Secretary of the Interior	March 15, 1946
101	Designating the Deputy Chief of Staff of the Army of the Philippines	March 18, 1946
102	Fixing office hours during the hot season	March 20, 1946
103	Authorizing the Associated Press, Manila, to operate a radio receiving station in the City of Manila for the purpose of copying for publication, in the public press, press messages from radio stations exterior to the Philippines	March 23, 1946
104	Further Amending Executive Order No. 82, dated December 24, 1945, as amended by Executive Order No. 87, dated January 24, 1946, which authorizes the Philippine Press Wireless, Inc., Manila, to continue handling by radio other types of service besides that authorized by the company's franchise	March 23, 1946
105	Further extending the period provided in Executive Order Numbered Two Hundred and Fifty-Eight, dated March Twelve, Nineteen Hundred and Forty, as amended by Executive Order Numbered Sixty-Six, dated September Fourteen, Nineteen Hundred and Forty-Five, for which payment may be authorized of the salaries or wages of newly appointed or transferred officers and employees of the National, provincial, city, and municipal governments while their appointments are pending action by the proper authorities	April 1, 1946
106	Organizing certain barrios of the municipality of Bigaa, province of Bulacan, into an independent municipality under the name of Pandi	April 17, 1946
107	Providing for the rehabilitation of domestic insurance companies, appropriating funds for that end, and for other purposes	April 20, 1946
108	Requiring all ships arriving in the Port of Manila to secure unloading permits	May 8, 1946
109	Transferring the seat of the municipal government of San Pablo, province of Isabela, from its present location at San Pablo to the barrio of Auitan	May 24, 1946
